is a Japanese tokusatsu drama. It is the 33rd entry in the Kamen Rider franchise and the fourth series of the Reiwa period.

Main characters

Ace Ukiyo
In the present, Ace becomes a famous celebrity after winning the "Daybreak" DGP and later makes DGP staff members Tsumuri and Girori part of his family after winning the "Encounter" DGP, intending to use the wish he will gain from winning the "Conspiracy" DGP to further infiltrate the organization and uncover the reason why he could not wish for Mitsume back. However, rules are put in place to limit him during the "Divergence" DGP.

Utilizing the Desire Driver, Ace can transform into the kitsune-themed Kamen Rider Geats. While transformed, he is adorned with the  scarf. His primary Form Raise Buckles are Magnum, which he can use either on its own to assume  or in conjunction with the Fever Slot Buckle to assume , and Boost, which he can use either on its own to assume  or in conjunction with the Fever Slot Buckle to assume .

During the "Lamentation" DGP, Ace acquires the Boost Mark II Buckle, which he can use to assume Boost Form Mark II.

Ace's four previous incarnations, including A's adult-self, are portrayed by unknown actors.

Keiwa Sakurai
 is a passive and caring, albeit naive, job-hunting university student who lives with his older sister after their parents were killed during a previous DGP despite being civilians and joins the "Encounter" DGP in the hopes of achieving his desire of "world peace", which stems from his volunteer work at non-profit organizations and childhood dream of becoming a guardian ninja. Throughout his time in the tournament, he records himself via video phone to archive his experience in case he loses his memories, with Tsumuri allowing it after Keiwa assures her that they are intended for his eyes only, After sustaining injuries that cause him to be eliminated during the penultimate round of the tournament, Keiwa temporarily loses his motivation until he becomes forcibly involved in the "Conspiracy" tournament, where he regains his memories while Ace provides him with a new Desire Driver from a retiring player. Following this, Keiwa competes to fulfill his new wish of reviving dead DGP players and gains a job at his favorite soba restaurant.

Utilizing the Desire Driver, Keiwa can transform into the tanuki-themed . His primary Form Raise Buckle is Ninja, which he can use either on its own to assume  or in conjunction with the Fever Slot Buckle to assume .

Neon Kurama
 is the only daughter of a wealthy and strict family led by her father, Kōsei, and a social media influencer who desires to find a decent lover who can help her live a normal life peacefully. She is protected by foreign bodyguards hired by her abusive mother Irumi, out of fear that potential kidnappers will ransom her for the Kurama family fortune following a childhood incident. Upon learning that Keiwa privately recorded video archives of himself during the DGP, Neon becomes inspired to do the same for herself. Following her participation in the "Encounter" DGP, she returns to being her parents' subservient daughter until Kōsei allows her to compete in the "Conspiracy" tournament as a late entry, during which she learns of her family's connection to the organization from her bodyguards. In the midst of the "Divergence" DGP, she ends up becoming the Desire Star and is forced to sabotage and/or kill her fellow competitors, until she is indirectly saved by the Jyamato in the final round.

Utilizing the Desire Driver, Neon can transform into the black cat-themed . Her primary Form Raise Buckle is Beat, which she can use either on its own to assume  or in conjunction with the Fever Slot Buckle to assume .

Michinaga Azuma
 is a construction worker, former high school delinquent, and the runner-up of the "Daybreak" DGP with an ambitious desire to surpass Ace Ukiyo, whom he considers a rival and blames for the death of his best friend and fellow former delinquent, Tōru Imai, who Ace failed to save from traitorous Kamen Riders during a previous DGP. Ever since, Michinaga became cynical, believing that all Riders are self-serving, and competes in the DGP to fulfill Tōru's desire for a landmark in his hometown along with his own to crush the Kamen Riders. After Ace is eliminated during the "Conspiracy" tournament, Michinaga's overconfidence leads to him being fatally wounded during the final round. Following the tournament's conclusion, Michinaga's body ends up in Archimedel's garden, where he is resurrected due to prolonged usage of the Zombie Raise Buckle, and escapes. Despite being brought back to the Jyamato garden by Niram and Samas to be killed, Beroba intervenes and convinces Michinaga to fight for the Jyamato to achieve his wish.

During the events of the film Kamen Rider Geats × Revice: Movie Battle Royale, which is set between his death and waking up in Archimedel's garden, Michinaga is temporarily revived for the Desire Royale.

Utilizing the Desire Driver, Michinaga can transform into the water buffalo-themed . His primary Form Raise Buckle is Zombie, which he can use either on its own to assume  or in conjunction with the Fever Slot Buckle to assume .

During the "Divergence" DGP, Michinaga acquires a Jyamato Buckle, which he can use either on its own to assume  or in conjunction with the Zombie Buckle to assume .

Recurring characters

Desire Grand Prix
Since ancient times, their primary mission is to recruit players to become Kamen Riders and defeat the mysterious "Jyamato" in a series of tournaments in exchange for granting the winner's wish. But once a chosen participant joins, they are bound by the game's rules, such as protecting civilians from Jyamato, and are forced to keep playing until they are either killed, removed from reality, disqualified, or find a replacement and returned to their regular lives with no memory of the DGP nor motivation towards fulfilling their wish.

They are also equipped with a  belt, which can combine with a user's personalized  disc to transform them into a base  Kamen Rider.

Tsumuri
 is a mysterious navigator for the DGP who provides the players with equipment and information while reporting to her masked superior, later revealed to be Girori. After Ace wins the "Encounter" tournament, he uses his wish to make Tsumuri his older sister, much to her dismay despite being disgusted by her co-workers attempting to sabotage Ace.

Girori
 is the salon concierge of the DGP who is later revealed to be the organization's masked Game Master. Realizing that Ace is using his winning streak to the infiltrate the DGP, despite managing to conceal his true position when Ace used his wish from winning the "Encounter" DGP to make the man his father, Girori decides to have him eliminated in the next tournament with Win's help. When Ace outwits Win, Girori decides to break the rules and abuse his position to intervene personally by becoming Kamen Rider Glare during the "Conspiracy" DGP's penultimate round and force an unwilling Win to eliminate Ace. Upon learning Ace planned ahead and had himself reinstated with full knowledge of Girori's identity, the latter abuses his position to arrange for Keiwa and Neon to kill Ace for him, but they expose him during a broadcast, leading to Niram firing Girori.

Utilizing the Vision Driver, Girori can transform into the black/red-colored . While transformed, he possesses the ability to attach  masks from his armor onto other Riders, forcing them to serve as his  puppets and use them as living bombs.

Win Hareruya
 is an energetic punk rock guitarist who tried to become a famous musician, but was forced to take a part-time job as a DGP staff member instead with help from his grandfather, whose company sponsors the organization. He initially appears in the "Encounter" tournament as a mysterious guest Rider for the teamwork round following Kanato Sumida's elimination, during which he is instructed to conceal his identity from the other participants. Following this tournament's end, Win resolves to become more than a silent non-player Rider in the "Conspiracy" tournament while Girori tasks him with sabotaging Ace. However, the other Kamen Riders learn of Win's motives when Michinaga catches him in the act of sabotaging Ace, resulting in Win eventually losing his DGP privileges for leaking vital information on the organization to Ace and being turned into a GM Rider by Girori, who eventually kills him.

Utilizing the Desire Driver, Win can transform into the grizzly bear/pumpkin/jack-o'-lantern-themed . His primary Form Raise Buckle is Monster, which he can use either on its own to assume  or in conjunction with the Fever Slot Buckle to assume .

Niram
 is the producer of the DGP who believes in fair play, responding to Girori's conduct by first providing Ace with the Command Twin Buckle at Gene's behest and then personally firing Girori.

Utilizing the Vision Driver, Niram can transform into the white/gold-colored . While transformed, he possesses the ability to deploy  drones from his armor to create an energy shield.

Samas
 is an assistant producer of the DGP.

Chirami
 is Girori's replacement, taking over during the "Divergence" DGP.

Raise Buckles
The  are a series of belt buckle-like items used by the Riders in the DGP to access new powers and abilities. Utilizing a Raise Buckle on the right-hand side of the Desire Driver affects the Rider's upper body while utilizing one on the left-hand side affects their lower body. If two Raise Buckles are used at once for the  combining function, a Rider can switch both sides of the Desire Driver to the opposite side via the  rotating function.

The two primary types of Raise Buckles are the plentiful small-sized  Raise Buckles, which grant the players a corresponding , and the rare large-sized  Raise Buckles, which allow the players to assume armor-based forms and augment Raise Weapons. Unlike the Armed Raise Buckles, the Form Raise Buckles' designs have a matching center design denoting their primary halves. As these Raise Buckles are difficult to find normally, most of them can be found quickly through either Secret Missions or emergency situations:

Its primary half is the Boost Buckle.
Unlike other Form Raise Buckles, the Boost Buckle can only be utilized until the user performs a  finisher and is the most difficult to find. Its primary half is the Magnum Buckle.
: An upgraded version of the Boost Buckle that allows the user to assume , which grants superhuman speed, pyrokinesis, and the use of the  ability, allowing the user to transform into an evolved version of the BooStriker's corresponding Animal Mode via the Revolve On function. However, this form has a side effect that consumes the user's energy, which causes them to faint after cancelling the transformation.
: Equips the user with the poisonous  gauntlet/sabaton and grants the use of the chainsaw-like  sword. While transforming, the Zombie Buckle produces poisonous liquid capable of dissolving the user's enemies into nothingness.
: Grants ninjutsu and the use of the double-bladed  sword, which can separate in half to form a pair of daggers.
: Equips the user with either the  gauntlets or the  sabatons. During the events of the film Kamen Rider Geats × Revice: Movie Battle Royale, the Monster Buckle is temporarily used by Kamen Rider Vice.
During the events of the film Kamen Rider Geats × Revice: Movie Battle Royale, the Beat Buckle is temporarily used by Kamen Rider Revi.
: A right-hand side exclusive Raise Buckle that allows the user to randomly summon either the armor of an existing Form Raise Buckle or the Raise Weapon of an Armed Raise Buckle. To signify the difference between regular Form Raise Buckle armors, Fever Forms replace the user's personal accessory with a  version. Five copies of the Fever Slot Buckle were created by Girori to counter the Jyamato's increasing power.
: A right-hand side exclusive Raise Buckle that equips the user with a pair of extra crane-like limbs on both the front and back of the armor's body as well as combine with one of the three auxiliary  Raise Buckles stored in the left-hand side exclusive  holder to grant them a corresponding . This set of Raise Buckles first appears in the film Kamen Rider Geats × Revice: Movie Battle Royale.

Sara Sakurai
 is Keiwa's older sister and a fan of Neon Kurama, and later Ace Ukiyo, who cares for Keiwa after their parents were killed in the crossfire of a previous DGP.

Kurama Family
The Kurama Family is an affluent family that runs a major conglomerate in Japan, which has sponsored the DGP, protected civilians, and kept the Jyamato's existence a secret from the world for generations following Kōsei's victory in a previous tournament.

: Neon's overprotective, controlling, and disapproving mother and co-CEO of a major conglomerate who fears for her daughter's safety and that of the family fortune after Neon was kidnapped as a child. Irumi took several precautions to prevent the incident from happening again, including hiring foreign bodyguards and implanting a GPS tracker in Neon.
: Neon's father and co-CEO of a major conglomerate who previously competed in and won a previous DGP, after which he wished her into existence. In the present, he allows her to participate in the DGP for his own reasons, placing him at odds with Irumi over Neon's well-being.
 and : Two foreign bodyguards that Irumi hired to protect Neon and participants of a previous DGP, with Ben competing as a black panther-themed Kamen Rider and John as a white tiger-themed Kamen Rider. Ben and John are portrayed by Michael Kinder and  respectively.

Archimedel

Daichi Isuzu
 is a quiz king and veteran DGP Rider who participates in the "Divergence" DGP to fulfill his wish of acquiring all of mankind's collective memories while secretly working for Beroba. After turning the other players against Keiwa by accusing him of being the Desire Star, Daichi is voted off, but returns later in the tournament to aid Beroba.

Utilizing the Desire Driver, Daichi can transform into the sparrow-themed . Like Punk Jack, his primary Form Raise Buckle is Monster, which he can use to assume Monster Form.

Ziin
 is a mysterious boy, DGP viewer, and Ace's Supporter.

Utilizing the Laser Raise Riser, Ziin can transform into the silver fox-themed . While transformed, he possesses gyrokinesis.

Kekera
 is a mysterious toad-like middle-aged man, DGP viewer, and Keiwa's Supporter who can assume a human form.

Utilizing the Laser Raise Riser, Kekera can transform into the frog-themed . While transformed, he possesses the ability to materialize a whip-like energy tongue from his mouth.

Beroba
 is a mysterious girl, sponsor of the Jyamato, and Michinaga's Supporter who seeks the Goddess of Creation.

Utilizing the Laser Raise Riser, Beroba can transform into the bull/mecha-themed . While transformed, she possesses levitation capabilities. She can also transform into Kamen Rider Glare 2 utilizing the Vision Driver she stole from Chirami.

Kyuun
 is a mysterious man, DGP viewer, and Neon's Supporter.

Utilizing the Laser Raise Riser, Kyuun can transform into the winged lion-themed . While transformed, he possesses flight capabilities and the ability to fire energy beams from his mouth.

Jyamato
Initially containing the memories and embodying the desires of fallen DGP players, the Jyamato gradually evolve into stronger variants with the ability to mimic the fallen players' forms. Additionally, if the DGP players lose against the Jyamato, a Jyamar Area will become an extension of the Jyamar Garden.

During the "Conspiracy" DGP, the Pawn Jyamato become stronger, with the added benefit of some utilizing a Desire Driver in conjunction with a Jyamato Buckle to become a Kamen Rider-like , gaining the ability to create vines to strangle victims. If a Jyamato Rider is defeated, another will take its place.  Furthermore, if a DGP player uses it for an extended period of time, the Jyamato Buckle will gradually turn them into a Jyamato.

: A Japanese castle-themed Slug Fortress Jyamato. It is destroyed by Kamen Rider Geats.
: Japanese clothing-themed Pawn Jyamato.
: Thief-themed Pawn Jyamato. It is destroyed by Kamen Rider Geats.
: A thief-themed Rook Jyamato.
: Zombie-themed Pawn Jyamato that infect their victims with a zombie virus by biting them, ignoring those they have already infected.
: Playing card-themed Pawn Jyamato that appear in pairs, which require two Kamen Riders to attack both Jyamato at the same time to prevent them from reviving each other.
: Training dummy-themed Pawn Jyamato summoned through a Spider Phone for training purposes.
: Cactus-themed Knight Jyamato that is among the most dangerous Jyamato sub-species due to their potential for killing multiple Riders at once and ability to enlarge themselves. One serves as the final boss of the "Encounter" DGP while a second one impersonates Tōru Imai during the "Lamentation" DGP before both are destroyed by Kamen Rider Geats. The second Cactus Knight Jyamato's human form is portrayed by Tasuku Maekawa, who also portrays the real Tōru Imai.
: Mafia-themed Pawn Jyamato that killed Keiwa and Sara Sakurai's parents in the crossfire of a previous DGP.
: Pirate-themed Pawn Jyamato that quickly eliminated most of the participants at an alarming rate during the first round of the "Conspiracy" DGP.
: Butler-themed Pawn Jyamato, one of which being the first Jyamato Rider that the Kamen Riders encounter.
: Maid-themed Pawn Jyamato and female counterparts to the Butler Jyamato, with one able to assume a Jyamato Rider form.
: A hide-and-seek-themed Bishop Jyamato capable of disguising itself as a little human girl and produce hallucinogenic gas that serves as a boss in the "Conspiracy" DGP's third round. It is destroyed by Kamen Rider Tycoon.
: A Western castle-themed Rafflesia Fortress Jyamato. It is destroyed by Kamen Rider Geats.
: Delinquent-themed Pawn Jyamato.
: A student-themed Pawn Jyamato. It is destroyed by Kamen Rider Geats.
: A principal-themed Pawn Jyamato that serves as a boss in the first round of the "Divergence" DGP. It is destroyed by Kamen Rider Geats.
: Courier-themed Pawn Jyamato.
: A bomber-themed Bishop Jyamato capable of making bombs disguised as fruit. It is destroyed by Kamen Rider Lopo.

"Takeshi Goutokuji" Jyamato
An unnamed Rook Jyamato that was created during the "Conspiracy" DGP and served as a mini-boss in the tournament's initial final round. After surviving being destroyed, it begins to mimic the appearance of fallen DGP player Takeshi Goutokuji in the "Divergence" DGP, becoming a recurring boss in the process.

The unnamed Rook Jyamato's human form is portrayed by Yamato Kinjo, who also portrays the real Takeshi Goutokuji.

Guest characters
: A chef and owner of a soba restaurant that the Sakurai siblings frequent and Keiwa eventually gets a job at. Fukuo Fukuoka is portrayed .
: A firefighter chosen to participate in the DGP as the polar bear-themed  and one of the three finalists of the "Daybreak" DGP who is killed by the Slug Fortress Jyamato.
: The director of human resources of an IT company that Keiwa interviewed for while job searching who joins the "Encounter" DGP as the crested penguin-themed  to achieve his desire of saving his sickly son. Although Keiwa's desire for world peace did not fit his company, Taira finds joy in this. Taira later crosses paths with Keiwa during the first round before he is fatally wounded fighting a Jyamato, dying with regret in Keiwa's arms, though Ace grants Taira's wish.
: A high school student and former aspiring basketball player who suffered a leg injury in a traffic accident and was forced to quit his dream. Ever since, he became a manipulative misanthropist who keeps to himself and developed a desire for "a world where humanity is extinct". While participating in the "Encounter" DGP as the panda-themed , an unaware Kanato is infected by a Zombie Jyamato, but uses his zombie status to justify freely attacking the other Kamen Riders, specifically Neon. After losing points for attacking Morio and being attacked by the other Riders due to his zombie status, Kanato is disqualified for putting his obsession to eliminate his competition over saving civilians and is replaced with Kamen Rider Punk Jack.
: A shady and dishonest playboy and former casino dealer whose tactics often get him in trouble. Putting on a friendly facade, he joins the "Encounter" DGP as the bighorn sheep-themed  to exploit or bend its rules, such as saving civilians he secretly arranged to be attacked by Jyamato. During the teamwork round, he attempts to abandon his assigned partner, Kamen Rider Punk Jack, in exchange for Michinaga, only to be eliminated after the latter abandons him for Keiwa at the last minute.
: A construction worker, former high school delinquent, and Michinaga's best friend who participated in a previous DGP tournament as a hedgehog-themed Kamen Rider to build a landmark in his hometown and previously used the Zombie Raise Buckle before he was assaulted by two unnamed Kamen Riders and killed by a Jyamato horde before Michinaga or Ace could rescue him. Ever since, the former took up the Zombie Raise Buckle to honor and avenge him in subsequent tournaments.
: Ace's missing mother and a previous DGP navigator.
: A goth girl who participates in the "Conspiracy" DGP as the goat-themed  to fulfill her wish of losing weight and marrying an idol she admires. However, due to her lack of combat experience, she is killed by a horde of Pirate Jyamato while attempting to flee.
: An elderly man who participates in the "Conspiracy" DGP as the great horned owl-themed  to fulfill his wish of becoming younger. Due to his age and condition however, he voluntarily gives up his place in the tournament to Keiwa.
: An athlete and veteran DGP Rider who participates in the "Divergence" DGP as the wolf-themed  to fulfill her wish of having a body that does not decline over time and supporting her family due to her father dying sometime prior. While she is initially thought to be the tournament's Desire Star who was secretly ordered to sabotage, later kill, her competitors, she discovers Neon Kurama is the true Desire Star, but allows herself to be scapegoated in light of her friendship with her. This, coupled with her family temporarily being taken hostage by the Jyamato before Neon rescues them leads to Sae voluntarily eliminating herself from the tournament to focus on supporting her family.

Spin-off exclusive characters

Kaima Todoroki
 is a former professional boxer who works for Korath and appears exclusively in the film Kamen Rider Geats × Revice: Movie Battle Royale. While participating in the Desire Royale to fulfill his father's wishes, Kaima attained a similar winning streak as Ace until the tournament is erased from existence. After becoming a target in the DGP, Kaima is defeated by Kamen Riders Geats and Revice and eliminated from the tournament.

Utilizing the Desire Driver, Kaima can transform into the deer-themed . His primary Form Raise Buckle is Powered Builder, which he can use to assume .

Korath

Eiichi Todoroki
 is Kaima Todoroki's corrupt politician father who views his son as a pawn to further his political power and appears exclusively in the film Kamen Rider Geats × Revice: Movie Battle Royale. He forces his youngest son, Kaima, to participate in the Desire Royale to fulfill his wish of becoming a dictator on his behalf, only to be arrested on bribery charges due to Ace winning the Desire Royale.

Notes

References

External links
Cast on TV Asahi

Geats
, Kamen Rider Revice